The Department of Finance (also called DoF) was an Australian government department with the mission to support and promote excellence in Commonwealth financial management and budgeting, and in program performance throughout the public sector. The department existed between December 1976 and October 1997.

History
The department was split from the Department of the Treasury in 1976 with the aim to separate financial oversight functions from economic policy functions generally, emulating changes Canadian Prime Minister Pierre Trudeau had introduced to his government.

Outcomes and scope
The department's mission was to support and promote excellence in Commonwealth financial management and budgeting, and in program performance throughout the public sector.

Information about the department's functions and/or government funding allocation could be found in the Administrative Arrangements Orders, the annual Portfolio Budget Statements, in the department's annual reports and on the department's website.

At its creation, the department dealt with:
Examination, review and evaluation of governmental expenditure proposals and programs. 
Collection and analysis of forward estimates of expenditure; and 
Administration of the Public Account.

Structure
The department was an Australian Public Service department, staffed by officials responsible to the Minister for Finance.

Notes

References and further reading

Ministries established in 1976
Finance